Yusuf Lawal (born 23 March 1998), nicknamed Obagol, is a Nigerian professional footballer who plays as a winger for Arouca in the Primeira Liga.

Club career
Lawal is a youth product of 36 Lion FC in Lagos since 2011, and gained the nickname Obagoal because of the similarity of his play to Obafemi Martins. He signed a 3+1 year contract with Lokeren in the summer of 2017. Lawal made his professional debut for Lokeren in a 3-0 Belgian First Division A win over Eupen on 14 April 2018.

On 16 July 2020, Lawal signed a 2+1 year contract with Azerbaijan Premier League side Neftçi PFK. 
 Yusuf Lawal scored his last goal against Sabah FK in a match played in Azerbaijan Premier League on August 20, 2022.

International career
Lawal was called up to a training camp for the Nigeria national under-23 football team in preparation for the 2015 Africa U-23 Cup of Nations, but did not make the final squad.

References

External links
 
 Sporting Profile
 Fox Sports Profile
 Bild Profile
 Tipsscore Profile
 Soccerzz Profile

1998 births
Sportspeople from Lagos
Living people
Nigerian footballers
Association football wingers
K.S.C. Lokeren Oost-Vlaanderen players
Neftçi PFK players
F.C. Arouca players
Belgian Pro League players
Azerbaijan Premier League players
Nigerian expatriate footballers
Expatriate footballers in Belgium
Nigerian expatriate sportspeople in Belgium
Expatriate footballers in Azerbaijan
Nigerian expatriate sportspeople in Azerbaijan
Expatriate footballers in Portugal
Nigerian expatriate sportspeople in Portugal